James Leland Walters Jr. (born June 13, 1969) is an American actor and singer, best known for his roles on Beverly Hills, 90210 and The Heights and singing lead vocal on "How Do You Talk to an Angel".

Career
Walters was born in Boston, Massachusetts,  and grew up in Marblehead, Massachusetts. After graduating from high school, he attended New York University and studied film for two years and studied acting at The Actors Space in New York City.

While attending college, he was discovered at a bank by a casting agent who placed him in three high-profile commercials for Levi's 501 Jeans. He then moved to Los Angeles to pursue an acting and musical career. He played a bit role on Everyday Heroes. His film debut came in 1991 with the movie Shout, alongside John Travolta, Heather Graham, and Gwyneth Paltrow. Walters performed the song "Rockin' the Pad" on the Shout soundtrack album.

In 1992, Aaron Spelling cast Walters as the lead on the Fox series The Heights, in which he also sang the theme song "How Do You Talk to an Angel?." The single reached number 1 on the Billboard Hot 100 on November 14, 1992. It was also nominated for an Emmy Award for "Outstanding Individual Achievement in Music and Lyrics". (The award went to Liza Minnelli.) The show was canceled by Fox, but it launched his music career when Atlantic Records took an interest in Walters and signed him to a recording contract.

In October 1994, he started playing Ray Pruit on Beverly Hills, 90210; he was the musician-boyfriend of Donna (played by Tori Spelling), a role he played for one season.

On September 20, 1994, Walters released his self-titled debut album Jamie Walters. The first single from the album, "Hold On", peaked at number 16 on the Billboard Hot 100, and number 76 in Australia. The album sold over 1 million copies and was certified platinum.

In 1997, he released his second album Ride. It was certified gold. A third album, Believed, followed in 2002. In 2009, he appeared in the VH1 reality show Confessions of a Teen Idol, in which former teen idols attempt to resurrect their careers. He became a firefighter and paramedic in 2002.

Personal life
In 2002, Walters married Patricia Walters; they have three children. She filed for divorce in 2015.

Filmography

Discography

Studio albums
Jamie Walters (1994)
Ride (1997)
Believed (2002)

Singles

References

External links

1969 births
Living people
American male film actors
American male singers
American male television actors
People from Marblehead, Massachusetts
People from Los Angeles County, California
Male actors from Massachusetts
20th-century American male actors
21st-century American male actors
Singers from Massachusetts
American firefighters